Dieter Gerald Janecek (born 25 May 1976) is a German politician of the Green Party (Alliance 90/The Greens) who has been serving as a member of the German Parliament since 2013. From 2008 to 2014 Janecek was chairman of the Bavarian Green Party.

In addition to his parliamentary mandate, Janecek has been serving as the Coordinator for the Maritime Industry and Tourism at the Federal Ministry for Economic Affairs and Climate Action since 2023.

Early life and education 
Janecek studied political science at the Bavarian School of Public Policy (HfP) in Munich.

Political career

Career in state politics 
In 2008, Janecek achieved via a verdict through the European Court of Justice that citizens under the impact of particulate pollution, could urge responsible authorities to reduce the pollution exceeding the legal threshold. As a consequence, Munich was forced to change its status quo and to establish a low-emission zone.

Janecek served as co-chair of the Green Party in Bavaria from 2008 until 2014, alongside Theresa Schopper (2008–2013) and Sigi Hagl (2013–2014); at the time, he was the youngest person to ever hold that position. He is also the founder of the nonpartisan transatlantic thinktank Die Transformateure.

Member of the German Bundestag, 2013-present 
Since the federal elections of 2013, Janecek was the Green Party candidate of the Munich constituency 221 München-West/Mitte. He has always received his seat in the Bundestag through his position on the Green electoral list.

In parliament, Janecek has been a member of the Committee on Economic Affairs (since 2013) as well as of the Committee on the Digital Agenda (2013–2021). He has served as his parliamentary group's spokesperson on economic policy (2013–2017, 2021–2023), the digital economy (2018–present) and industrial policy (since 2019). Janecek also serves as a member of the Study Commission of the Bundestag on "Artificial Intelligence – Social Responsibility and Economic, Social and Ecological Potential".

In the negotiations to form a so-called traffic light coalition of the Social Democratic Party (SPD), the Green Party and the Free Democrats (FDP) following the 2021 German elections, Janecek was part of his party's delegation in the working group on innovation and research, co-chaired by Thomas Losse-Müller, Katharina Fegebank and Lydia Hüskens.

Other activities
 Energy and Climate Policy and Innovation Council (EPICO), Member of the Advisory Board (since 2021)
 Baden-Badener Unternehmer-Gespräche (BBUG), Member of the Board of Trustees (since 2020)
 Bundesverband der Unternehmervereinigungen (BUV), Member of the Advisory Board
 Blockchain Bundesverband, Member of the Advisory Board
 Energy Watch Group (EWG), Member
 German Bioenergy Industry Association (BBE), Member of the Advisory Board
 German-Israeli Business Association, Member of the Board of Trustees
 Parlamentsgruppe Luft- und Raumfahrt, Member of the Board
 Verein Nationalpark Nordsteigerwald, Member of the Board of Trustees
 German Federation for the Environment and Nature Conservation (BUND), Member

Political positions
Amid the COVID-19 pandemic in Germany, Janeck joined forces with five other parliamentarians – Gyde Jensen, Konstantin Kuhle, Andrew Ullmann, Kordula Schulz-Asche and Paula Piechotta – on a cross-party initiative in 2022 to support legislation that would require all those who have not had yet been vaccinated to receive counselling before later requiring all adults above 50 years to be vaccinated.

References

1976 births
Living people
Members of the Bundestag for Bavaria
Members of the Bundestag 2021–2025
Members of the Bundestag 2017–2021
Members of the Bundestag 2013–2017
People from Pirmasens
Members of the Bundestag for Alliance 90/The Greens